Markethill High School is a secondary school located in Markethill, County Armagh, Northern Ireland. The school caters for 11- to 16-year-olds and currently has 490 pupils. It is within the Southern Education and Library Board area.

Overview
In March 2012 the school won the British Academy Award for the Best Mainstream School for Modern Languages in Northern Ireland. In addition, the school has been shortlisted to the final 3 entries for the Best Mainstream School in the UK for Modern Languages. In January 2012 the school won £4000 to fund a STEM project (Science / Technology / Engineering / Mathematics) based on an exciting, innovative and highly creative cross-curricular initiative.

In 2011 the school opened a new state-of-the-art fitness suite and gymnasium which is open to the public three evenings per week. In 2012 the school's Art and Music Departments will be refurbished and there will be new rugby posts on the Pinley Green site.

Exam Results

In 2019, in James Maxwell's last year as Principal, the school was ranked as the 7th top non-selective school in Northern Ireland.

History
The school opened in 1959, and was renovated and extended in 1985.

Principals

 1959 - 1984           Mr J.McCartney
 1984 - 1994           Mr W.G.S.Parr
 1994 - 2011           Mr S.J.Loughrey
 2011–2019        Mr J.A.Maxwell 
2019–present  Mr Colin Berry

References

Infosite

Secondary schools in County Armagh
Educational institutions established in 1959
1959 establishments in Northern Ireland
People educated at Markethill High School